Ouranopithecus macedoniensis is a prehistoric species of Ouranopithecus from the Late Miocene of Greece. See more detail at Ouranopithecus.

This species is known from three localities in Northern Greece. The type location is Ravin de la Pluie. The other localities are Chalkidiki and Xirochori. It is known from a large collection of cranial fossils and few postcranial. The material has been dated to the late Miocene 9.6 – 8.7 million years old, so slightly earlier than O. turkae. To some this suggests O. turkae is the direct descendant of O. macedoniensis, although it is generally accepted that they are sister taxa.

Etymology
The specific epithet macedoniensis is due to the holotype fossil's discovery location in Macedonia, Greece.

Habitat
Examination of dental remains of O. macedoniensis and associated bovid species indicate a habitat of low tree cover and a rich herbaceous layer.

Morphology
O. macedoniensis had a large, broad face with a prominent supraorbital torus.  It also had square-shaped orbits.  O. macedoniensis may have had a relatively large body size. The postcranial evidence is thin, but the dentition of O. macedoniensis suggests extreme sexual dimorphism, a far higher degree than that seen in any extant great ape. The ape was probably a quadruped. It is not possible to postulate on how O. macedoniensis used the trees but it seems likely that it did.
O. macedoniensis'''s molar enamel cover was fairly thick and had low cusps. The male O. macedoniensis had large canine teeth with shearing lower premolars.

Diet
Based on the heavily pitted surface of the second molar of Ouranopithecus macedoniensis'', it is assumed that its diet consisted of harder foods such as nuts or tubers.

Behaviour
Behaviour is very difficult to infer in species with such a small diversity of fossil remains. The large body size may have made climbing difficult in some aspects so it may have been a terrestrial forager but this is speculation within the literature.

References

Miocene primates of Europe
Prehistoric apes
Fossil taxa described in 1977
Prehistoric Greece